Erinaceusyllis, previously known as Sphaerosyllis (Claparède, 1863), is a genus belonging to the phylum Annelida, a group known as the segmented worms. This genus consists of several species that were previously described as Sphaerosyllis and as Sphaerosyllis erinaceus sub-species, differing by the compound chaetae.

In 2005, San Martín argued these differences were sufficient to consider them as different species, trigerring a taxonomic redescription of the Syllidae, and describing this genus, Erinaceusyllis. Erinaceusyllis is similar to Sphaerosyllis. Species of Sphaerosyllis, however, always exhibit papillae on the pharyngeal opening, their pharyngeal tooth is conical and is always located on or very near to the anterior margin of the pharynx. They usually count with a short proventricle, itself provided with large muscle cell rows, large posterior acicula (which is distally bent at 90°), blades of compound chaetae which are short and unidentate, and offspring developing ventrally, females without capillary notochaetae, only present on males. Sphaerosyllis horrockensis, Sphaerosyllis belizensis, and Sphaerosyllis centroamericana were transferred to Erinaceusyllis under these distinguishing characteristics. At the same time, Prosphaerosyllis is close to Erinaceusyllis, but its species' pharyngeal teeth are rhomboidal to oval and located near the middle of their pharynges; also their antennae are short, tentacular and their dorsal cirri have a bulbous cirrophore and retractile cirrostyle. Their papillae are larger in number and of different sizes.

Description
The species' body is minute, densely covered by papillae which are small, short, sometimes being distributed on cirri and parapodia. Its prostomium possesses three antennae, four eyes and two anterior eyespots. Its peristomium is large, covering the posterior margin of the prostomium, and in cases forming two dorsolateral wings covering the nuchal organs; it counts with only one pair of tentacular cirri. Dorsal cirri on its second chaetiger 2 are either absent or present, depending on the species, although they are usually absent.

Its antennae, tentacular and dorsal cirri are spindle-shaped to pyriform, with somewhat bulbous bases. It carries a single pair of anal cirri similar to dorsal cirri although a bit longer. Its compound chaetae are heterogomph, with short or long blades, sometimes bidentate, unidentate, or a combination of both.

Its pharyngeal tooth is small, conical to rhomboidal in shape, located near the pharyngeal anterior margin, sometimes near its middle. The pharynx usually shows no papillae around its opening, but they are present in larger species. Its proventricle is long and wide, barrel-shaped, with thin muscle cell rows, counting with around 15 to 22. Mature males exhibit natatory chaetae, while females brood eggs dorsally by means of capillary notochaetae.

Distribution
Erinaceusyllis is a marine genus, while some of its species are possibly cosmopolitan.

Species
Its type species is Erinaceusyllis erinaceus, formerly Sphaerosyllis erinaceus (Claparède, 1863). It is thought to inhabit waters of Normandy, but is suspected to be cosmopolitan. In 2005, San Martín argued the original description was incomplete, stating the species has been reported worldwide, but that those records likely represent a complex of different species that need to be re-examined. Up to 2015, at least 12 species have been described, namely E. belizensis, E. bidentata, E centroamericana, E. cirripapillata, E. cryptica, E. erinaceus, E ettiennei, E. hartmannschroederae, E horrocksensis, E. kathrynae, E. opisthodentata, E. serratosetosa. The family contains two other genera, Sphaerosyllis (48 species) and Prosphaerosyllis.

References

Further reading

External links

WORMS entry
Erinaceusyllis erinaceus - WORMS

Annelid genera
Syllidae